Alberta Netcare (formerly Wellnet) is the province of Alberta's public Electronic Health Record used to store patient information so that it is easily accessible to healthcare professionals.

Users
There are three main categories of Netcare users:
 Health service providers (physicians)
 Diagnostic laboratories
 Drug dispensing locations (pharmacies)

Netcare allows authorized physicians to view the medical records of patients. Pharmacies can use the service to verify prescription details, and to upload medication dispensations.

Information stored and accessed 
The patient's health record is stored on Netcare.  Information like immunizations, ECG results, diagnostic images and reports, written medical reports (e.g. surgery reports, consultations, hospital admissions), diagnostic lab testing results (e.g. blood tests, urine tests, blood bank info), allergies and intolerances (drug and food allergies, food intolerances), drug checker (checks the prescribed medication and dose to see if it interacts with other medications or is unsuitable for people with certain allergies), prescription history, and general patient information (e.g. name, birthdate, personal health number, address, phone number).

Implementation
Netcare messaging is performed with HL7-encoded XML messages.  Messages are sent and received over a HTTPS connection.

Security
Netcare uses a two-factor authentication protocol involving a username/password combination, and an RSA SecurID Key Fob for authentication. Users who are within the trusted networks of the Government of Alberta (e.g. hospitals) do not require the RSA key for login.

The SSL certificate for the remote login portal is TLS_RSA_WITH_3DES_EDE_CBC_SHA, 112 bit keys, TLS 1.2.

Breaches and attacks
From May 15–29, 2009 a Trojan virus was detected on several Alberta Health and Netcare systems, compromising the privacy of 11,582 Edmonton area patients.

See also
eHealth Ontario

References

External links
Alberta Netcare official site 
Alberta Netcare Remote Login Portal
Alberta Privacy Commissioner report on the May breach

Electronic health records
Telehealth
Health in Alberta